Peter Murray may refer to:
Peter Murray (architectural writer) (born 1944), British architectural journalist
Peter Murray (art historian) (1920–1992), professor of history of art
Peter Murray (Harvard Law School), lecturer at Harvard Law School
Pete Murray (born 1969), Australian singer-songwriter
Pete Murray (DJ) (born 1925), British radio and television presenter
Pete Murray (American musician), American musician and singer-songwriter
Peter Murray (Yorkshire Sculpture Park), founding director of Yorkshire Sculpture Park
Peter J. Murray (born 1951), retired mathematics teacher and children's author
Peter Marshall Murray (1888–1969), president of the National Medical Association, 1932–1933
Peter Murray (rugby union) (1884–1968), New Zealand rugby union player and politician

See also
Peter Murray-Rust (born 1941), chemist
Peter Murray-Willis (1910–1995), English cricketer